"Slam Dunk (Da Funk)" is a song by British boy band Five, released in late 1997 as the first single from their debut album, Five (1998). Featuring a blend of pop and rap, the single was written and produced by Jake Schulze, Max Martin, and Denniz Pop. It contains a sample of "Clap Your Hands" by Herbie Crichlow. The single reached number 10 on the UK Singles Chart and sold around 500,000 copies worldwide.

It was not released in many countries other than the UK and none outside Europe apart from the United States and New Zealand, where it reached number 86 and number 22, respectively. Also in the US, the song was chosen as the NBA's new theme song. In other countries, Five's first single was "When the Lights Go Out". The song was featured on the soundtrack to the TV series Sabrina, the Teenage Witch and the Disney Channel Original Movie Smart House.

During the band's greatest hits tour in 2013, Scott Robinson and Abz Love changed the lyrics of the song. Instead of the line "when the 5 of us make 1", Scott would sing "when the 4 of us make 1" acknowledging the fact that J didn't reunite with the band earlier in the year. The line "We got J, A.B., Rich, Sean and Scott" was changed to "We got Abz on the mic Rich, Sean and Scott". Upon Abz's departure from the group, rapping duties were handed to Scott and the line would then once again be changed to "We got Rich and Sean and Scott La rock".

Critical reception
Stephen Thomas Erlewine from AllMusic complimented the song as a "expertly constructed" single, that is "delivered professionally" by the group. He also declared it as "infectious, catchy, perfect for the radio." Larry Flick from Billboard described it as a "funky-esque pure-pop ditty that tries to conjure a hipper, "streetier" vibe". A reviewer from Daily Record stated that the song is a "must tune for the office Christmas party". British magazine Music Week gave it five out of five, picking it as Single of the Week. They added, "After months of careful preparation the new boy band emerge with a solid, storming funk/pop/rap song. A certain hit, but lacking the wide appeal of a Christmas number one." Dave Fawbert from ShortList commented, "Every single second of this - audio and video - is amazing, including some phenomenal ‘boyband walking down a corridor’ footage. Of course it was written by Max Martin like 97% of all amazing pop music ever."

Music video
There were made two different music videos for the song; one for the UK and another for the US market.

Track listings

 USA CD single
 "Slam Dunk (Da Funk)" (Radio Edit) - 3:38
 "Slam Dunk (Da Funk)" (NBA Edit) - 2:30

 USA CD maxi single
 "Slam Dunk Da Funk" (Extended Mix) - 7:06
 "Slam Dunk (Da Funk)" (Candy Girls Radio Mix) - 3:52
 "Slam Dunk (Da Funk)" (Future Funk Radio Mix) - 4:30
 "Slam Dunk (Da Funk)" (Sol Brothers Radio Mix) - 3:57
 "Slam Dunk (Da Funk)" (Bug Remix) - 6:36
 "Slam Dunk (Da Funk)" (NBA Edit) - 2:30
 "When the Lights Go Out" (Loop Da Loop Full Vocal Mix) - 4:50

 UK CD1
 "Slam Dunk (Da Funk)" (Radio Edit) - 3:38
 "Straight Up Funk" - 4:00
 "Slam Dunk (Da Funk)" (Candy Girls Vocal Club Mix) - 6:31
 "Slam Dunk (Da Funk)" (Video) - 3:41

 UK CD2 (Includes Limited Edition Poster)
 "Slam Dunk (Da Funk)" (Radio Edit) - 3:38
 "Slam Dunk (Da Funk)" (Candy Girls Club Mix) - 5:16
 "Slam Dunk (Da Funk)" (Future Funk Mix) - 6:35
 "Slam Dunk (Da Funk)" (Sol Brothers Mix) - 8:57
 "Slam Dunk (Da Funk)" (Bug Remix) - 6:36

Charts

Weekly charts

Year-end charts

Certifications and sales

See also

Five discography

References

External links
Slam Dunk (Da Funk) (UK release) at discogs.com
Slam Dunk (Da Funk) (European release) at discogs.com
 
 Top Of The Pops Performance

1997 debut singles
Five (band) songs
Songs written by Jake Schulze
Songs written by Denniz Pop
Songs written by Max Martin
Songs written by Herbie Crichlow
Song recordings produced by Max Martin
Song recordings produced by Denniz Pop
1997 songs